The Presidential Unit Citation (PUC), originally called the Distinguished Unit Citation, is awarded to units of the uniformed services of the United States, and those of allied countries, for extraordinary heroism in action against an armed enemy on or after 7 December 1941 (the date of the Attack on Pearl Harbor and the start of American involvement in World War II). The unit must display such gallantry, determination, and esprit de corps in accomplishing its mission under extremely difficult and hazardous conditions so as to set it apart from and above other units participating in the same campaign.

Since its inception by President Franklin D. Roosevelt with the signing of Executive Order 9075 on 26 February 1942, retroactive to 7 December 1941, to 2008, the Presidential Unit Citation has been awarded in conflicts such as World War II, the Korean War, the Vietnam War, Iraq War, and the War in Afghanistan.

The collective degree of valor (combat heroism) against an armed enemy by the unit nominated for the PUC is the same as that which would warrant award of the individual award of the Distinguished Service Cross, Air Force Cross or Navy Cross. In some cases, one or more individuals within the unit may have also been awarded individual awards for their contribution to the actions for which their entire unit was awarded a Presidential Unit Citation.  The units with the most Presidential Unit Citations are submarine  and the 1st Marine Division, both with nine citations.

Creation and official format

Army, Air Force, and Space Force
The Army citation was established by Executive Order 9075 on 26 February 1942, superseded by Executive Order 9396 on 2 December 1943, which authorized the Distinguished Unit Citation. As with other Army unit citations, the PUC is in a larger frame than other ribbons, and is worn above the right pocket. All members of the unit may wear the decoration, whether or not they personally participated in the acts for which the unit was cited; only those members assigned to the unit at the time of the action cited may wear the decoration as a permanent award. For both the Army, Air Force, and Space Force the emblem is a solid blue ribbon enclosed in a gold frame.

The Air and Space Forces PUC was adopted from the Army Distinguished Unit Citation after the Air Force became a separate military branch in 1947. By Executive Order 10694, dated Jan. 10, 1957 the Department of the Air Force redesignated the Distinguished Unit Citation as the Presidential Unit Citation. The Air and Space Forces PUC is the same color and design as the Army PUC but slightly smaller, so that it can be worn in alignment with other Air Force and Space Force ribbons on the left pocket following personal awards.  As with the Army, all members of a receiving unit may wear the decoration while assigned to it, but only those assigned to the unit at the time of the action cited may wear the decoration as a permanent award; or if any member of a receiving unit had it at their last duty station prior to being either discharged or retired, they may continue to wear the decoration as prescribed.

For the Army, only on rare occasions will a unit larger than battalion qualify for award of this decoration.

Navy and Marine Corps

The Navy version has navy blue, yellow, and red horizontal stripes, and is the only Navy ribbon having horizontal stripes. To distinguish between the two versions of the Presidential Unit Citation, the Navy version which is more often referred to simply as the Presidential Unit Citation, is referred to as the Navy Presidential Unit Citation and sometimes as the "Navy and Marine Corps Presidential Unit Citation". The ribbon is worn by only by those Navy and Marine service members who were assigned to the unit for the "award period" of the award. In the Army, those who join the unit after the "award period" may also wear it while assigned to the unit. ALNan 137-43 states that the first award has a blue enameled star on the ribbon and additional stars for subsequent awards.  In 1945 the Secretary of the Navy wrote the Iwo Jima PUC without the line "and all those attached to or serving with".   In 1949, the award was changed with no star for the first award and bronze stars for subsequent awards.

Special clasps

USS Nautilus (SSN-571)

To commemorate the first submerged voyage under the North Pole by the nuclear-powered submarine  in 1958, all members of her crew who made that voyage were authorized to wear their Presidential Unit Citation ribbon with a special clasp in the form of a gold block letter N.  U.S. Navy sailors assigned to the USS Nautilus memorial at the Submarine Force Museum in Groton, Connecticut, are permitted to wear the Navy Presidential Unit Citation with “N” device while serving there.

As of 2014, the same device may be awarded for the Nuclear Deterrence Operations Service Medal for those personnel who work in direct support of ICBM operations who serve 179 non-consecutive days dispatched to a missile complex.

USS Triton (SSRN-586)

To commemorate the first submerged circumnavigation of the world by the nuclear-powered submarine  during its shakedown cruise in 1960, all members of her crew who made that voyage were authorized to wear their Presidential Unit Citation ribbon with a special clasp in the form of a golden replica of the globe.

Coast Guard
United States Coast Guard units may be awarded either the Navy or Coast Guard version of the Presidential Unit Citation, depending on which service the Coast Guard was supporting when the citation action was performed.

The current decoration is known as the "Department of Homeland Security Presidential Unit Citation".  The original Coast Guard Presidential Unit Citation was established under the authority of Executive Order 10694 (signed by President Dwight D. Eisenhower on January 10, 1957), and amended by Section 74 of Executive Order 13286 (signed by President George W. Bush on February 28, 2003) to transfer the award of the USCG PUC to the Secretary of Homeland Security.

Special clasp

A Coast Guard version of the award was awarded to all U.S. Coast Guard and Coast Guard Auxiliary personnel by President George W. Bush for rescue and relief operations in response to Hurricane Katrina from 29 August 2005 to 13 September 2005. All who received the award for responding to Hurricane Katrina are authorized to wear the Presidential Unit Citation ribbon with a special clasp in the form of the internationally recognized hurricane symbol.

U.S. Public Health Service Commissioned Corps 

The United States Public Health Service Presidential Citation was established in 2015. The design was finalized by the Army Institute of Heraldry on 17 August 2015. On 24 September 2015, President Barack Obama presented the Presidential Unit Citation to the officers of the United States Public Health Service Commissioned Corps for the 2013–2016 Ebola epidemic in West Africa and the United States. On 19 January 2021, President Donald Trump presented the citation to all Commissioned Corps officers serving from 2020–2021, for their extraordinary performance of duty during the COVID-19 pandemic. A gold frame is placed around the Presidential Unit Citation ribbon to indicate a second award.

Recipients

World War II

Army

Army Air Forces

Navy
{| class="wikitable sortable mw-collapsible mw-collapsed" align="left"
! Unit !! Service !! Year awarded !! Campaign or battle !! Notes
|-
|valign="top"|||valign="top"|U.S. Navy||valign="top"|1945||valign="top"|Midway / Pacific Campaign ||valign="top"|

USS REDFISH 395 received a PRESIDENTIAL UNIT CITATION which read "For extraordinary heroism in action during the First and Second War Patrols against enemy Japanese surface units in the restricted waters of the Pacific. Operating In bold defiance of foul weather and persistent hostile depth charging, gunfire and bombing by outnumbering forces of radar-equipped ships, air escorts and patrol craft, the U.S.S. REDFISH launched her accurate and intensive gun and torpedo fire during brief periods of concentrated attack to sink a new Japanese aircraft carrier with her entire complement of embarked planes and equipment destined to be used against our forces, to damage severely another vital carrier and to destroy or cripple much additional shipping necessary to the enemy’s continued prosecution of the war. Although forced to the bottom In 230 feet of water by vicious countermeasures, with her pressure hull cracked and numerous leaks throughout, the REDFISH responded gallantly to the superb handling of her skilled and aggressive ship's company and succeeded in evading further damage and returning to port. Her brilliant record of success in combat and her indomitable fighting spirit in the face of the most determined and fierce counterattacks by an alert and relentless enemy reflect the highest credit upon the REDFISH, her valiant officers and men and the United States Naval Service."
|-
|valign="top"|||valign="top"|U.S. Navy||valign="top"|1941||valign="top"|Cavite Navy Yard / Philippine Islands ||valign="top"|

USS PIGEON ASR-6 received two PRESIDENTIAL UNIT CITATION awards retroactively, after President Roosevelt created the award in 1942.  The first was for her specific action at the start of the Japanese invasion of The Philippines at Cavite Naval Yard on 10 December 1941.  The second was for her ongoing service during the invasion through the month of December, 1941.

"Pigeon was moored in a five-ship nest at the Cavite Navy Yard 10 December 1941 when Japanese bombers launched massive raids. But Commander Hawes had relieving tackles rigged, steam at throttle, and men ready for action. His foresight saved Pigeon and submarine Seadragon, soon to become a tonnage champion of World War II." Pigeon was the first US Navy ship to receive the PRESIDENTIAL UNIT CITATION and the only Navy ship to receive two of them during World War II.

|-
|valign="top"|||valign="top"|U.S. Navy||valign="top"|1943||valign="top"|Solomon Islands Campaign ||valign="top"|

The President of the United States takes pleasure in presenting the PRESIDENTIAL UNIT CITATION to the UNITED STATES SHIP USS O’BANNON (DD-450) for service as set forth in the following CITATION:
"For outstanding performance in combat against enemy Japanese forces in the South Pacific from October 7, 1942, to October 7, 1943. An aggressive veteran after a year of continuous and intensive operations in this area, the U.S.S. O’BANNON has taken a tremendous toll of vital Japanese warships, surface vessels, and aircraft. Launching a close-range attack on hostile combatant ships off Guadalcanal on the night of November 13, 1942, the O’BANNON scored three torpedo hits on a Japanese battleship, boldly engaged two other men o’ war with gunfire and retired safely in spite of damage sustained. During three days of incessant hostilities in July 1943, she gallantly stood down Kula Gulf to bombard enemy shore positions in coverage of our assault groups, later taking a valiant part in the rescue of survivors from the torpedoed U.S.S. STRONG while under fierce coastal battery fire and aerial bombing attack and adding her firepower toward the destruction of a large Japanese naval force. In company with two destroyers, the O’BANNON boldly intercepted and repulsed nine hostile warships off Vella Lavella on October 7, 1943, destroying two enemy ships and damaging others. Although severely damaged, she stood by to take aboard and care for survivors of a friendly torpedoed destroyer and retired to base under her own power. The O’BANNON's splendid achievements and the gallant fighting spirit of her officers and men reflect great credit upon the United States Naval Service."
For the President, /s/ Frank Knox, Secretary of the Navy
|-
|valign="top"|||valign="top"|U.S. Navy||valign="top"|1943||valign="top"|Guadalcanal Campaign ||valign="top"|Navy Citation, for service at Guadalcanal from August through December 1942:

"The vessel arrived off Guadalcanal on 7 August, disembarked her troops, unloaded her cargo, and left the Solomons two days later, bound for New Caledonia. Alchiba returned to Guadalcanal on 18 September. After unloading cargo to support marines struggling for that island, she sailed back to New Caledonia for more supplies and returned to Guadalcanal on 1 November. She was anchored off Lunga Point at 0616 on 28 November, when two torpedoes from the Japanese submarine 1-16 exploded on the vessel's port side. At that time, her hold was loaded with drums of gasoline and ammunition, and the resulting explosion shot flames  in the air. The commanding officer ordered the ship to get underway to run her up on the beach. This action undoubtedly saved the ship. Hungry flames raged in the ship for over five days before weary fire fighting parties finally brought them under control. Salvage operations began soon thereafter. Most of her cargo was saved, and temporary repairs were in progress when Alchiba was torpedoed again on 7 December. An enemy submarine's conning tower had been spotted shortly before two torpedoes were fired. One passed close under the cargo ship's stern, but the other struck her port side near the engine room. The blast killed three men, wounded six others, and caused considerable structural damage. Once the fires and flooding were controlled, salvage operations resumed and enabled the ship to get underway for Tulagi on 27 December 1942."<ref>Dictionary of American Fighting Ships, Department of the Navy</ref>
|-
|valign="top"|||valign="top"|U.S. Navy||valign="top"|1944||valign="top"|
|The President of the United States takes pleasure in presenting the PRESIDENTIAL UNIT CITATION to the UNITED STATES SHIP ARCHERFISH for service as set forth in the following CITATION:

"For extraordinary heroism in action during the Fifth War Patrol against enemy Japanese combatant units in restricted waters of the Pacific. Relentless in tracking an alert and powerful hostile force which constituted a potential threat to our vital operations in the Philippine area, the U.S.S. ARCHERFISH culminated a dogged six and one-half-hour pursuit by closing her high speed target, daringly penetrated the strong destroyer escort screen, and struck fiercely at a large Japanese aircraft carrier (SHINANO) with all six of her torpedoes finding their mark to sink this extremely vital enemy ship. Subjected to devastating air and surface anti-submarine measures, the ARCHERFISH skillfully evaded her attackers by deep submergence and returned to port in safety. Handled with superb seamanship, she responded gallantly to the fighting determination of the officers and men and dealt a fatal blow to one of the enemy's major Fleet units despite the most merciless Japanese opposition and rendered valiant service toward the ultimate destruction of a crafty and fanatic enemy."
For the President, /s/ James Forrestal Secretary of the Navy
|-
|valign="top"|||valign="top"|U.S. Navy||valign="top"|1945||valign="top"|
U.S. submarine campaign against the Japanese Empire
|The President of the United States takes pleasure in presenting the PRESIDENTIAL UNIT CITATION to the UNITED STATES SHIP BARB for service as set forth in the following CITATION:

"For extraordinary heroism in action during the Eighth, Ninth, Tenth, and Eleventh War Patrols against enemy Japanese surface forces in restricted waters of the Pacific. Persistent in her search for vital targets, the USS BARB relentlessly tracked down the enemy and struck with indomitable fury despite unfavorable attack opportunity and severe countermeasures. Handled superbly, she held undeviatingly to her aggressive course and, on contacting a concentration of hostile ships in the lower reaches of a harbor, boldly penetrated the formidable screen. Riding dangerously, surfaced, in shallow water, the BARB launched her torpedoes into the enemy group to score devastating hits on the major targets, thereafter retiring at high speed on the surface in a full hour's run through uncharted, heavily mined and rock obstructed waters. Inexorable in combat, the BARB also braved the perils of a tropical typhoon to rescue fourteen British and Australian prisoners of war who had survived the torpedoing and sinking of a hostile transport ship en route from Singapore to the Japanese Empire. Determined in carrying the fight to the enemy, the BARB has achieved an illustrious record of gallantry in action, reflecting the highest credit upon her valiant officers and men and upon the United States Naval Service."
|-
|valign="top"| Hunter-Killer Groups ||valign="top"|U.S. Navy||valign="top"|1944||valign="top"|
Battle of the Atlantic
|The President of United States takes pleasure in presenting the PRESIDENTIAL UNIT CITATION to the following six Anti-Submarine Task Groups which operated with the U.S.S. BOGUE as Flagship:

TG 21.11 – United States Ships Bogue, Haverfield, Swenning, Willis, Hobson (until March 25), Janssen (until April 7), and VC-96, from February 26 to April 19, 1944.

TG 22.2 – United States Ships Bogue, Haverfield, Swenning, Willis, Janssen, F.M. Robinson, and VC-69, from May 4 to July 3, 1944.

TG 22.3 – United States Ships Bogue, Haverfield, Swenning, Willis, Janssen, Wilhoite and VC-42, from August 1–24, 1944.

For service as set forth in the following CITATION:

"For extraordinary heroism in action against enemy submarines in the Atlantic Area from April 20, 1943, to August 24, 1944. Carrying out powerful and sustained offensive action during a period of heavy German undersea concentrations threatening our uninterrupted flow of supplies to the European theater of operations, these Six Anti-Submarine Task Groups tracked the enemy packs relentlessly, and by the unwavering vigilance and persistent aggressiveness of all units involved, sank a notable number of hostile U-boats. The gallantry and superb teamwork of the officers and men who fought the embarked planes and manned the BOGUE and her escort vessels were largely instrumental in forcing the complete withdrawal of enemy submarines from supply routes essential to the maintenance of our established military supremacy."

For the President,
James Forrestal
Secretary of the Navy

(Note 1: This text was taken from a citation to USS Haverfield, which does not list three cited periods that the Bogue operated without Haverfield: 20-APR-1943 to 20-JUN-1943, 12-JUL-1943 to 23-AUG-1943, 14-NOV-1943 to 29-DEC-1943, per http://www.usshorne.net/horne/images/ribbons/opnavnote1650.pdf)

(Note 2: The Navy considers this as one award, covering multiple dates, per http://www.usshorne.net/horne/images/ribbons/opnavnote1650.pdf)
|-
|valign="top"|||valign="top"|U.S. Navy||valign="top"|1943||valign="top"|Air raids on the Marshall Islands (1942), Doolittle Raid, Battle of Midway, Battle of the Eastern Solomons, Battle of the Santa Cruz Islands, Naval Battle of Guadalcanal, Guadalcanal Campaign ||valign="top"|Navy Citation, for 7 December 1941 to 15 November 1942. First aircraft carrier to receive the PUC.  Most decorated U.S. Navy ship from World War II.

"For consistently outstanding performance and distinguished achievement during repeated action against enemy Japanese forces in the Pacific war area, December 7, 1941, to November 15, 1942. Participating in nearly every major carrier engagement in the first year of the war, the Enterprise and her air group, exclusive of far-flung destruction of hostile shore installations throughout the battle area, did sink or damage on her own a total of 35 Japanese vessels and shoot down a total of 185 Japanese aircraft. Her aggressive spirit and superb combat efficiency are fitting tribute to the officers and men who so gallantly established her as an ahead bulwark in the defense of the American nation."
|-
|valign="top"|||valign="top"|U.S. Navy||valign="top"|1945||valign="top"|Airgroup 31. Marshall Islands, Truk, Palau, Hollandia,  Marianas, Bonins, Yap, Philippines.
Airgroup 29. Ryukyus, Formosa, Philippines, Luzon, China Sea, Japan, Bonins.
|valign="top"|One of 3 light aircraft carriers to be awarded the Presidential Unit Citation in WW II.

The President of the United States takes pleasure in presenting the PRESIDENTIAL UNIT CITATION to the U.S.S. CABOT and her attached Air Groups participating in the following operations:

January 29 to February 16, 1944, Marshalls, Truk; March 29 to April 30, 1944, Palau, Hollandia, Truk; June 11 to August 5, 1944, Marianas, Bonins, Yap; September 6 to 24, 1944, Philippines, Palau, Yap: AG-31 (VF-31, VT-31).

October 10 to November 25, 1944, Ryukyus, Formosa, Philippines, Luzon; December 14 to 16, 1944, Luzon; January 3 to 22, 1945, Philippines, Formosa, China Sea, Ryukyus; February 16 to 25, 1945, Japan, Bonins; March 18 to April 8, 1945, Ryukyus, Japan: AG-29 (VF-29, VT-29).

for service as set forth in the following CITATION:

"For extraordinary heroism in action against enemy Japanese forces in the air, ashore and afloat in the Pacific War Area from January 29, 1944, to April 8, 1945. Operating continuously in the most forward areas, the U.S.S. CABOT and her air groups struck crushing blows toward annihilating Japanese fighting power; they provided air cover for our amphibious forces; they fiercely countered the enemy's aerial attacks and destroyed his planes; and they inflicted terrific losses on the Japanese in Fleet and merchant marine units sunk or damaged. Daring and dependable in combat, the CABOT with her gallant officers and men rendered loyal service in achieving the ultimate defeat of the Japanese Empire."
|-
|valign="top"|||valign="top"|U.S. Navy||valign="top"| 1942,1944||valign="top"|Java Campaign, ending with Second Battle of the Java Sea ||valign="top"|Navy Citation... "(f)or action in the Battle of Sunda Strait." Sunk in action with HMAS Perth against incredible odds. The two ships steamed into a Japanese invasion force and were sunk in the ensuing battle.
|-
|valign="top"|||valign="top"|U.S. Navy||valign="top"|1945||valign="top"|Battle of Okinawa
|valign="top"|USS Hugh W. Hadley (DD-774)

"For extraordinary heroism in action as Fighter Direction Ship on Radar Picket Station Number 15 during an attack by approximately 100 enemy Japanese planes, forty miles northwest of the Okinawa Transport Area, May 11, 1945. Fighting valiantly against waves of hostile suicide and dive-bombing planes plunging toward her from all directions, the U.S.S. HUGH HADLEY sent up relentless barrages of antiaircraft fire during one of the most furious air-sea battles of the war. Repeatedly finding her targets, she destroyed twenty enemy planes, skillfully directed her Combat Air Patrol in shooting down at least forty others and, by her vigilance and superb battle readiness, avoided damage to herself until subjected to a coordinated attack by ten Japanese planes. Assisting in the destruction of all ten of these, she was crushed by one bomb and three suicide planes with devastating effect. With all engineering spaces flooded and with a fire raging amidships, the gallant officers and men of the HUGH W. HADLEY fought desperately against almost insurmountable odds and, by their indomitable determination, fortitude and skill, brought the damage under control, enabling their ship to be towed to port and saved. Her brilliant performance in this action reflects the highest credit upon the HUGH W. HADLEY and the United States Naval Service."
|-
|valign="top"|||valign="top"|U.S. Navy|| valign="top"|1942,1944||valign="top"|Java Campaign, endingwith Second Battle of the Java Sea || Navy Citation... "(f)or extraordinary heroism in action against enemy Japanese forces in the Java Campaign in the Southwest Pacific War Area, from January 23 to March 1, 1942...".
|-
|valign="top"|||valign="top"|U.S. Navy||valign="top"|1942 to 1945||valign="top"|CAG-29 (VGS-29, VGF-29), North Africa, November 8 to 11, 1942; CAG-29, Task Group 21.11, June 13 to August 6, 1943; CVEG-26, Palau, Yap, Ulithi, Woleai Raid, March 30 to April 1, 1944; CVEG-26, Western New Guinea Operation, April 22 to May 5, 1944; CVEG-26, Western New Guinea Operation, September 15 to 27, 1944; CVEG-26, Leyte Operation, October 12 to 27, 1944; CVEG-24, Okinawa Gunto Operation, March 25 to June 16, 1945; CVEG-24, Third Fleet Operations against Japan, July 10 to 15, 1945||valign="top"|USS Santee (CVE-29)

"For extraordinary heroism in action against enemy forces in the air, ashore and afloat.  Operating in the most advanced areas, the U.S.S. SANTEE and her attached air squadrons struck with sustained fury at hostile warships, aircraft, merchant shipping and shore installations in the face of frequent and prolonged enemy air attacks.  During the historic Battle for Leyte Gulf, the valiant SANTEE withstood successively the shattering explosion of a suicide plane in her flight deck and a torpedo hit in her side, stoutly conducting flight operations and fighting her antiaircraft guns throughout the period of emergency repairs.  Despite the strain of constant alerts and long periods of unrelieved action, she sent out her planes to cover our landing operations and land offensives and to destroy the enemy's vital airfields and his camouflaged dispersal areas.  The SANTEE's illustrious record of combat achievement reflects the highest credit upon her gallant officers and men and upon the United States Naval Service."
|-
|valign="top"|||valign="top"|U.S. Navy||valign="top"|1945||valign="top"|U.S. submarine campaign against the Japanese Empire ||valign="top"|Navy Citation, for first through sixth war patrols – 8 June 1943 to 30 June 1945

"For extraordinary heroism in action during the Second and Third War Patrols against enemy Japanese surface forces in restricted waters of the Pacific. Operating dangerously in defiance of extremely strong air and surface opposition, the U.S.S. SEALION penetrated deep into hostile waters to maintain a steady offensive against ships vital to Japan's prosecution of the war. Consistently outnumbered and outgunned, she pursued her aggressive course in spite of formidable screens and severe anti-submarine measures to strike at every opportunity and, by her concentrated torpedo fire, delivered against convoys and combatant ships, sank thousands of tons of enemy shipping including one large battleship and a destroyer of a major hostile task force, and seriously damaged another battleship. Daring and skilled in carrying the fight to the enemy, the SEALION also braved the perils of a tropical typhoon to rescue fifty-four British and Australian prisoners of war, survivors of a hostile transport ship torpedoed and sunk while en route from Singapore to the Japanese Empire. Her meritorious record of achievement is evidence of her own readiness for combat and the gallantry and superb seamanship of the officers and men who brought her through unscathed."
For the President,
/signed/ JAMES FORRESTAL Secretary of the Navy
|-
|-
|valign="top"|||valign="top"|U.S. Navy||1943||valign="top"|U.S. submarine campaign against the Japanese Empire ||valign="top"|Navy Citation, for fifth, sixth, and seventh war patrols – 30 April to 8 December 1943
|-
|valign="top"|||valign="top"|U.S. Navy||1945||valign="top"|U.S. submarine campaign against the Japanese Empire ||valign="top"|Navy Citation for first war patrol – March 1945.  Commanding Officer George L. Street III awarded Medal of Honor
|-
|Torpedo Squadron 8 (VT-8) (2 citations) ||U.S. Navy||1943|| Battle of Midway || For first combat mission, 4 June 1942. Second citation for Battle of Guadalcanal
|-
|Mine Division 34 (Pacific Fleet) ||U.S. Navy||1945||Borneo||USS Sentry (Flagship)—Borneo Liberation Support
|-
|valign="top"|Task Unit 77.4.3(a.k.a. "Taffy 3")||valign="top"|U.S. Navy||valign="top"|1944||valign="top"|Battle off Samar
|Taffy 3 was made up of six escort carriers, three destroyers and four destroyer escorts:  and VC-65,  and VC-4,  and VC-3,  and VC-68,  and VC-5,  and VC-10, .

In the Battle off Samar, these 13 ships repelled the 23 battleships, heavy cruisers, light cruisers and destroyers of the Japanese Center Force engaged in the collection of naval battles associated with the landings at Leyte Gulf.

"For extraordinary heroism in action against powerful units of the Japanese Fleet during the Battle off Samar, Philippines, October 25, 1944. Silhouetted against the dawn as the Central Japanese Force steamed through San Bernardino Strait towards Leyte Gulf, Task Unit 77.4.3 was suddenly taken under attack by hostile cruisers on its port hand, destroyers on the starboard and battleships from the rear. Quickly laying down a heavy smoke screen, the gallant ships of the Task Unit waged battle fiercely against the superior speed and fire power of the advancing enemy, swiftly launching and rearming aircraft and violently zigzagging in protection of vessels stricken by hostile armor-piercing shells, anti-personnel projectiles and suicide bombers. With one carrier of the group sunk, others badly damaged and squadron aircraft courageously coordinating in the attacks by making dry runs over the enemy Fleet as the Japanese relentlessly closed in for the kill, two of the Unit's valiant destroyers and one destroyer escort charged the battleships point-blank and, expending their last torpedoes in desperate defense of the entire group, went down under the enemy's heavy shells as a climax to two and one half hours of sustained and furious combat. The courageous determination and the superb teamwork of the officers and men who fought the embarked planes and who manned the ships of Task Unit 77.4.3 were instrumental in effecting the retirement of a hostile force threatening our Leyte invasion operations and were in keeping with the highest traditions of the United States Naval Service."
For the President,
/signed/ JAMES FORRESTAL Secretary of the Navy

This unit also awarded the Philippine Presidential Unit Citation Badge for the same action, dated October 12, 1984.
|-
|valign="top"|||valign="top"|U.S. Navy||valign="top"|1945||valign="top"|Battle of Okinawa
|
"For extraordinary heroism in action as a Picket Ship on Radar Picket Station during a coordinated attack by approximately twenty-five Japanese aircraft near Okinawa on May 3, 1945. Shooting down two Kamikazes which approached in determined suicide dives, the U.S.S. Laffey was struck by a bomb from a third suicide plane as she fought to destroy this attacker before it crashed into her superstructure and sprayed the entire area with flaming gasoline. Instantly flooded in her after engine room and fireroom, she battled against flames and exploding ammunition on deck and, maneuvering in a tight circle because of damage to her steering gear, countered another coordinated suicide attack and destroyed three Kamikazes in rapid succession. Still smoking heavily and maneuvering radically, she lost all power when her forward fireroom flooded under a seventh suicide plane which dropped a bomb close aboard and dived in flames into the main deck. Unable to recover from this blow before an eighth bomber crashed into her superstructure bulkhead only a few seconds later, she attempted to shoot down a ninth Kamikaze diving toward her at high speed and, despite the destruction of nearly all her gun mounts aft when this plane struck her, took under fire the tenth bomb-laden plane, which penetrated the dense smoke to crash on board with a devastating explosion. With fires raging uncontrolled, ammunition exploding and all engine spaces except the forward engine room flooded as she settled in the water and listed to port, she began a nightlong battle to remain afloat and, with the assistance of a towing vessel, finally reached port the following morning. By her superb fighting spirit and the courage and determination of her entire company, the Laffey upheld the finest traditions of the United States Naval Service."
|-
|valign="top"|||valign="top"|U.S. Navy||valign="top"|1942||valign="top"|Naval Battle of Guadalcanal
|
Shortly after midnight on 13 November 1942, at the start of the Naval Battle of Guadalcanal, the destroyer USS Laffey was crippled early in the battle yet engaged two Japanese battleships and two destroyers at point-blank range. At one point Laffey was so close to the battleship  that she was able to use her machine guns to cause critical damage to the control and communication systems on the bridge of the battleship, wound her commanding officer Admiral Hiroaki Abe, and kill Abe's chief of staff. Before she herself was sunk in the battle, Laffey contributed to the sinking of a cruiser and two destroyers.
|-
|valign="top"|||valign="top"|U.S. Navy||valign="top"|1944||valign="top"|U.S. submarine campaign against the Japanese Empire
|
For Patrols 1 and 2. Charles Elliott Loughlin in command.
|-
|USS Nicholas (DD-449)
|U.S. Navy
|1943
|Battle of Kula Gulf
|“For outstanding performance in action against enemy Japanese forces off Kolombangara Island, New Georgia Group, Solomon Islands, on the night of July 5–6, 1943. After waging a vigorous battle as part of the small Task Force which destroyed a superior Japanese surface force, the NICHOLAS remained behind with an accompanying destroyer to save the survivors of the torpedoed U.S.S. HELENA. Forced to clear the area on three occasions during rescue operations, she gallantly fought off continuing attacks by Japanese warships emerging from Kula Gulf and, with the other destroyer, sank or damaged an enemy light cruiser and two destroyers with deadly torpedo and gunfire, returning to the area after each onslaught to complete the heroic rescue of more than seven hundred survivors. The valorous achievements of the NICHOLAS reflect great credit upon the United States Naval Service.”
|}

Marine Corps

Korean War

Air Force

Marine Corps

Army

United Nations Forces

Cold War

Vietnam War

Persian Gulf War

Global War on Terrorism

Iraq War

Other actions

U.S. and Non-U.S. Unit recipients

For a full list of non-U.S. units receiving Distinguished Unit Citations and later the renamed Presidential Unit Citation see Non-U.S. recipients of U.S. gallantry awards#Unit citations

World War II

A reconnaissance and intelligence unit (1st Bn.) of the 394th Infantry Regiment, on the 16th December 1944 at Losheimergraben, found itself in a situation which turned into a decisive battle with an overwhelming German Paratrooper Bn. Almost 40 years later their heroic fight was awarded with the Presidential Unit Citation Order No. 26 in 1981. The memorial plaque is mounted on a stone at the N626 at the Losheimergraben crossroads.

Says Captain John Della-Giustina, "For their exploits, the I&R Platoon, 394th Infantry Regiment, 99th Infantry Division, would later become "the most heavily decorated platoon for a single action in World War II."

Two units of the Free French Forces were awarded Presidential Unit Citations during World War II. The first was the 2nd Armored Division, which received the award after the liberation of Strasbourg; the second was the 3rd Foreign Infantry Regiment, which received it in 1946 with the inscription 'Rhine-Bavarian Alps'.

On April 22, 1986, the 1st Fighter Aviation Group of the Força Aérea Brasileira (the Brazilian Air Force) was awarded the Presidential Unit Citation for its actions in the Po Valley region of Italy in World War II.  The Brazilians, operating in Italy in support of Allied forces, destroyed in one day (April 22, 1945) over 45 vehicles, strafed pontoon bridges on the River Po (hampering a German retreat) and harassed fixed positions of the German forces. From the citation:

Korean War
The 1st Battalion, Gloucestershire Regiment and Troop C, 170th Independent Mortar Battery RA of the British Army were both awarded US Presidential Unit Citations for their defence of Hill 235 whilst surrounded by Chinese forces during the Battle of the Imjin River also known by the US as the Battle of Solmari. The 2nd Battalion, Princess Patricia's Canadian Light Infantry and 3rd Battalion, Royal Australian Regiment were awarded the citation for their actions during the Battle of Kapyong, shortly afterwards.

One Belgian-Luxembourgian battalion of the Belgian United Nations Command (now the 3rd Parachute Regiment,) was awarded the Presidential Unit Citation once for actions during the Battle of the Imjin River.

The Colombia Battalion received the citation while attached to the American 21st Infantry Regiment in 1951.

One Dutch unit, the Netherlands Detachment United Nations, part of the Regiment Van Heutsz, was awarded the Presidential Unit Citation twice for actions during the Korean War. The first citation was awarded after the battle near Wonju and Hoengson in February 1951. The unit was awarded a second time for its bravery during the Soyang River Battle in May–June 1951.

President Harry Truman signed a Distinguished Unit Citation (now the Presidential Unit Citation) on July 11, 1951, for the Turkish Brigade's acts of heroism. It reads: "The Turkish Brigade, a member of the United Nations Forces in Korea is cited for exceptionally outstanding performance of duty in combat in the area of Kumyangjang-ni, Korea, from 25 to 27 January 1951."

The Greek Expeditionary Force (Korea), Sparta Battalion, received its first US Presidential Unit Citation in February 1952 for the capture of Scotch Hill. It was awarded the Presidential Unit Citation for the second time for their actions in the defense of Outpost Harry while vastly outnumbered by Chinese forces, June 18, 1953. The 13th Flight of the Royal Hellenic Air Force received a US Presidential Unit Citation for its participation in the evacuation of US Marines at Hagaru-ri in December 1950.

The French battalion of the UN forces in Korea, attached to the 23rd Infantry Regiment, US 2nd Infantry Division ("Indian Head"), received 3 Distinguished Unit Citations in 1951 : on February 20, July 11 (actions in Chipyong-Ni) and August 9 (as part of the 2nd Infantry Division).

The 2 Squadron SAAF of South Africa was awarded the honour, which was presented in August 1956.

41 Commando Royal Marines was awarded the US Navy and Marine Corps PUC for its actions at the Chosin Reservoir while attached to the 1st Marine Division.

The 17th Bombardment Group was awarded the Republic of Korea Presidential Unit Citation for the period May 24, 1952 – March 31, 1953 and Distinguished Unit Citation for actions December 1, 1952 – April 30, 1953.

Vietnam War
President Lyndon B. Johnson awarded a Presidential Unit Citation to 1st Brigade 101st Airborne June 2–22 during Operation Hawthorne Dak To Province elements of 327th Tiger Force & Attached Recon of A troop 17th Cavalry also were awarded a Vietnam Presidential Unit Citation from South Vietnamese Prime Minister Nguyễn Cao Kỳ for extraordinary heroism; the 2nd 327 also received a second Presidential citation from President Johnson at the Battle of Tou Mourong in 1966.

A Presidential Unit Citation was awarded to D Company, 6th Battalion, Royal Australian Regiment, on 28 May 1968, for the units actions during the Battle of Long Tan on 18 August 1966.

In 1968 The Presidential Unit Citation was awarded to units of the 3rd Brigade of the 4th Infantry Division (2/12th Inf, 3/22nd Inf,2/22nd Mech Inf,  2/77th Artillery and Brigade Command unit at the battle site) for their participation in the Battle of Suoi Tre. In addition elements of the 2/34th Armor were also awarded the PUC for their participation in that battle.  That battle would have the distinction of killing more of the enemy in a one day battle of the entire war. 647 dead enemy soldiers were recovered from the battle site at the conclusion of the battle. See PUC General Orders 59, dated 21 October 1968

In 1968, the Presidential Unit Citation was awarded to the 3d Marine Division (Reinforced) "for extraordinary heroism and outstanding performance of duty" ... "from 8 March 1965 to 15 September 1967." See MCBul 1650 for included units list.

In 1969, the Presidential Unit Citation was awarded to USS Harnett County (LST-821) by President Richard Nixon, for Extraordinary Heroism during the period 12 December 1968 to 30 April 1969 supporting Operation Giant Slingshot on the Vam Co Dong River.
<Award Citation>

In 2012, the Presidential Unit Citation was awarded to the 4th contingent, CDT3 [Clearance Diving Team 3], Royal Australian Navy for service during the Vietnam War in 1968/69.

In 1977, the Presidential Unit Citation was presented to New Zealand's 161 Battery in 1977 for service during the Vietnam War in 1965–66.

In 1971, the Presidential Unit Citation was awarded to the 3d Armored Cavalry Squadron, Army of the Republic of Vietnam and attached U.S. Advisor/Liaison Personnel for extraordinary heroism during the period 1 January 1968 to 30 September 1968 in actions in Pleiku and Binh Dinh Provinces. (DA General Order No. 24, 27 April 1971.)

In 2001, the Presidential Unit Citation was awarded to the Republic of Vietnam Air Force 219th Helicopter Squadron (South Vietnam), Danang, Republic of Vietnam while assigned or attached to MACV-SOG for extraordinary heroism, great combat achievement and unwavering fidelity while executing unheralded top secret missions deep behind enemy lines across Southeast Asia during the period 24 January 1964 to 30 April 1972. (DA General Order No. 25, 8 June 2001.)

In 1966, the Presidential Unit Citation was awarded to the 514th Tactical Fighter Squadron of the Republic of Vietnam Air Force for extraordinary heroism and outstanding performance of duty in combat against an armed enemy of the Republic of Vietnam throughout the period 1 January 1964 to 28 February 1965.

In 1968 and 1970 the Air Force's 56 Special Operations Wing (56 SOW) was awarded two Presidential Unit Citations for extraordinary heroism and outstanding performance of duty while conducting Search and Rescue (SAR) operations in North Vietnam and Laos as well as strike, interdiction and Forward Air Control (FAC) operations against hostile forces.

Units of the Army, 3rd battalion, 16th Artillery were awarded the presidential unit citation for actions during the January, 1968 Tet offensive in Vietnam. They provided sustained artillery fire under severe conditions that protected their own troops and prevented the attacking forces of North Vietnam and the Viet Cong from retreating. The support they provided lasted for 72 hours, during which time the troops had no sleep and no time to eat. Some units of the 16th artillery received sniper and mortar fire but continued supporting troops in spite of the risks involved.

In 1973 the PUC was awarded to Carrier Air Wing Nine and USS Constellation for extrarodinary heroism. On May 10, 1972 VF-92 and VF-96 shot down 7 Migs tying the single day record of any air unit. Wing pilots received 5 Navy Crosses, and 24 Silver Stars.

Operation Enduring Freedom
On December 7, 2004, the Combined Joint Special Operations Task Force-South, known as Task Force K-BAR, a special collection of U.S. and international special forces units, was awarded the Presidential Unit Citation. This award, for service between 17 October 2001 and 30 March 2002, was very unusual in that it was made to multiple international units fighting in the War in Afghanistan.

The following units were recognized:
 Australian Special Air Service Regiment (although not a part of Task Force K-Bar)
 Canada's Joint Task Force 2
 New Zealand Special Air Service
 Denmark's Specialoperationsstyrke and Jægerkorpset Norway's Forsvarets Spesialkommando, Hærens Jegerkommando and Marinejegerkommandoen Germany's Kommando Spezialkräfte''
 American units, including the
U.S. Navy SEALs
Special Warfare Combatant-craft Crewmen
U.S. Army Special Forces
Air Force Special Operations Command

In the Presidential Unit Citation for Task Force K-BAR, Major General W. Semianiw, Chief Military Personnel For the Chief of the Defense Staff, stated:

In 2012, the Navy and Marine Corps Presidential Unit Citation was awarded and presented at the U.S. Embassy in Canberra to two members of the Australian Army for service as embedded members of the Marine Expeditionary Brigade-Afghanistan for outstanding performance in action against enemy forces from 29 May 2009 to 12 April 2010, in support of Operation Enduring Freedom.

See also

 Awards and decorations of the United States military
 Non-US recipients of US gallantry awards
 Philippine Republic Presidential Unit Citation
 Republic of Korea Presidential Unit Citation
 Vietnam Presidential Unit Citation

Notes

References

External links

Military awards and decorations of the United States
Awards and decorations of the United States Air Force
Awards and decorations of the United States Army
Awards and decorations of the United States Coast Guard
Awards and decorations of the United States Marine Corps
Awards and decorations of the United States Navy
Awards and decorations of the United States Space Force
Awards established in 1942
1942 establishments in the United States